Brian Whittaker is an American record producer, songwriter and recording artist. He has worked with numerous artists and musicians, including Bone Thugs-n-Harmony, Lyfe Jennings, Tahj Mowry, Bone Thugs-n-Harmony, Brianna Hildebrand and Dr. Dre.

Background 
Whittaker was born in Los Angeles, California and moved with his mother to Michigan when he was three years old. While in elementary school, Whittaker learned how to play the drums and guitar. In 2009, Whittaker produced and co-wrote See Me Shine featuring Lyfe Jennings, the first single of Bone Thugs-n-Harmony's eighth studio album Uni5: The World's Enemy which peaked at #49 on Billboard Hot 100, #30 on Hot R&B/Hip-Hop Songs, and  #10 on the US Rap Songs Chart. He was the original creator of the single which was created in 2005. The album peaked at #19 on the New Zealand music chart and at #14 on the Billboard 200 albums chart. In 2013, his remix version of Yulianna’s song, Don't Take Your Love Away peaked at #49 on the Billboard Dance Club Songs Chart.
Whittaker composed soundtracks for several American television series and films such as Motives 2, Faster, Keeping up with the Kardashians, Kourtney & Kim Take Miami, Sorority Party Massacre, Love and Hip Hop: Hollywood, and Kourtney and Kim Take New York.

Composer filmography

References

External links 
 Official website
 

Living people
American songwriters
American record producers
Musicians from California
Year of birth missing (living people)